Our Better Selves is a lost 1919 silent film war drama directed by George Fitzmaurice and starring Fannie Ward and Lew Cody. It was produced by Astra Films and distributed by Pathé Exchange.

Cast
Fannie Ward - Loyette Merval
Lew Cody - Willard Standish
Charles Hill Mailes - Henry Laurens

References

External links

1919 films
American silent feature films
Lost American films
Films directed by George Fitzmaurice
Films with screenplays by Ouida Bergère
American black-and-white films
American war drama films
1910s war drama films
Pathé Exchange films
1919 drama films
1910s American films
Silent American drama films
Silent war drama films